Martin Claesson (born 20 September 1983) is a Swedish footballer who plays for IFK Värnamo as a defender. He is the older brother of Viktor Claesson.

References

External links

1983 births
Living people
Association football defenders
Swedish footballers
IFK Värnamo players
Östers IF players
Allsvenskan players
Superettan players
People from Värnamo Municipality
Sportspeople from Jönköping County